Barik Ab (also Romanized as Bārīk Āb; also known as Barkāb and Barkoud) is a village in Ijrud-e Bala Rural District, in the Central District of Ijrud County, Zanjan Province, Iran. At the 2006 census, its population was 715, in 181 families.

References 

Populated places in Ijrud County